"Cinderella" is the first single from The Cheetah Girls' self-titled soundtrack album The Cheetah Girls, as well as their debut single. It officially premiered on Radio Disney on July 23, 2003. It is a cover of the i5 song from their 2000 self-titled album. The single was released officially on August 12 the same year. The song has a pop sound and was written by Lindy Robbins and Kevin Savigar.

Music video
The video for the features the performance of "Cinderella" from the movie and clips of the movie are intercut throughout the video.

Trivia
 The song was originally recorded by American girl group i5 in 2000.
 The song was then covered by Swedish girl group Play for their debut album in 2001.
 Taiwanese girl group S.H.E covered the song in early 2003.
 It was also covered by Cheetah Girls in 2003. Notably, the line referencing "Snow White waiting"  is changed to "someone waiting".
 Thai singer Tata Young covered the song in 2004.
 This song was awarded Radio Disney's Song of the Year title in 2006.

Songs based on fairy tales
Songs about princesses
Songs about fictional female characters
The Cheetah Girls songs
2000 songs
Walt Disney Records singles
Songs written by Kevin Savigar
Songs written by Lindy Robbins
Songs with feminist themes
2003 debut singles